Events in the year 1964 in Cyprus.

Incumbents 

 President: Makarios III
 President of the Parliament: Glafcos Clerides

Events 

 4 March – U.N. Security Council Resolution 186 was adopted unanimously. It asked the Government of Cyprus to take all additional measures necessary to stop violence and bloodshed and called on communities in Cyprus and their leaders to act with restraint.

Deaths

References 

 
1960s in Cyprus
Years of the 21st century in Cyprus
Cyprus
Cyprus
Cyprus